Lim Fang Yang (born 14 February 1989) is a Malaysian badminton player. Lim started playing badminton at age 4, and he entered the Pahang State team when he was 10. In 2007, he reached the semi-final round of the Asian Junior Championships losing to Chen Long (who subsequently became World no.1), settling for the bronze medal. In 2012, he won the Miami International tournament in the men's singles event.

Upon leaving the national team in 2012, he became the sparring partner for the other Malaysia national team players such as Lee Chong Wei until 2015. He was hand-picked by the Badminton Association of Malaysia (BAM) to coach the Junior National team and impart his valuable experience and skills till 2018.

Through the years, he had been with BAM for over 16 years. Training and competing alongside the top players of Malaysia. He is versatile in both singles and doubles play, competing in both categories through his career. As he found joy and achievement in coaching, he set up his own academy in Kuala Lumpur, coaching young aspiring players.

Coach Fang Yang was invited to Singapore in early 2018 to coach the training of more advanced players. He helped out for more than a year before setting up his own academy in Singapore. Having coached for more than a year and witnessed the different levels of players through the age group competitions, he is familiar with the badminton scene in Singapore. 

He strongly believes that for a player to excel, the person must be equipped with the correct skills. To achieve this, there is a need to focus on precise skill mastery, agile footwork, strong fitness and savvy game play. Only by mastering detailed skills, a player will be able to execute the most effective and efficient shots that will pressure and defeat the opponent. 

His approach is different. The training he received from the legendary coaches from China, Malaysia and Indonesia, impressed on him that to achieve results, the focus must be on detailed skill mastery. That translates to taking the shots at the right angle, at the right position with the right strength and executed with agile footwork.

He imparts these world class badminton skills to his students. Many showing significant improvement after a period of time.

Career 
National badminton player of Badminton Association of Malaysia (BAM) from 2002-2012.

Sparring badminton player of Badminton Association of Malaysia (BAM) from 2013 - 2015.

Independent professional badminton player of Air Asia Badminton Team from 2014-2015.

Badminton Association of Malaysia (BAM) national coach for junior team from 2015-2018.

Achievements

Asian Junior Championships 
Boys' singles

BWF International Challenge/Series 
Men's singles

  BWF International Challenge tournament
  BWF International Series tournament

References

External links 
 

Malaysian male badminton players
1989 births
Living people
Sportspeople from Kuala Lumpur
Malaysian sportspeople of Chinese descent